Waynesburg University is a private university in Waynesburg, Pennsylvania. It was established in 1850 and offers undergraduate and graduate programs in more than 70 academic concentrations. The university enrolls over 2,500 students, including approximately 1,800 undergraduates.

History
In honor of General Anthony Wayne, the university was founded in 1849 as Waynesburg College by the Cumberland Presbyterian Church — now affiliated with the Presbyterian Church (USA) — and was officially established with a charter by the Commonwealth of Pennsylvania in 1850.

Waynesburg University is located on a contemporary campus on the hills of southwestern Pennsylvania, and has also facilities in the Greater Pittsburgh Region.

Miller Hall and Hanna Hall are listed on the National Register of Historic Places.

Academics

Curriculum
Waynesburg University offers Bachelor's and Master's degrees in up to 70 majors and minors.

Accreditation
The university is accredited by the Middle States Commission on Higher Education.

Graduate and professional studies (GPS)
The university offers graduate programs in business, counseling, education, criminal investigation and nursing. The programs are designed to serve the working professional in the Pittsburgh region and beyond via off-campus facilities in the Greater Pittsburgh region.

The Graduate School of Professional Studies offers degrees in athletic training, business, nursing, education, counseling and criminal investigation at the Pittsburgh facilities as well as in Waynesburg and online. The Master of Business Administration (MBA) program (IACBE accredited) is the third largest in the Pittsburgh region. Waynesburg University also offers a Doctoral Program of Nursing Practice (CCNE Accredited) and a Ph.D. in Counselor Education and Supervision (CACREP Accredited).

Stover Center for Constitutional Studies and Moral Leadership
Waynesburg University’s Stover Center for Constitutional Studies and Moral Leadership, named after Dr. W. Robert Stover, brings Stover Constitutional Fellows and other guest speakers to campus and offers an array of experiences to a select group of students designated as Stover Scholars. These experiences include special seminars, visits with state officials, and internships in the fields of government, law, and public policy.

Facilities

University
Facilities at Waynesburg University include:
 faculties
 administration offices
 a chapel
 a performing arts center
 a gym with a basketball and a volleyball court and a wrestling ring 
 a library
 a museum
 a laboratory
 a student center
 a dining hall
 residence halls
 a fitness center
 tennis courts
 a baseball field
 a football stadium
 a TV station
 a radio station
 a newspaper agency

Parks
Waynesburg University is built around four spacious parks owned by the town of Waynesburg. The westernmost park contains a bridge meandering through the trees; the next park features a gazebo; and the two parks nearest the university center are commonly referred to as the Fountain Park and the Statue Park. Fountain Park is directly in front of Hanna and Miller Hall, while Statue Park is between Buhl Hall, Stewart Hall, Pollock Hall, and Martin Hall. Statue park features a statue dedicated to the lives lost in the Civil War. The combined area of the parks is approximately 15 acres.

Residence halls
The university is home to ten campus residence halls, seven women's and three men's halls. Martin and Thayer Hall are home to most of the men on campus. They both are double occupancy halls on the Eastern side of campus. Martin Hall is closer to downtown Waynesburg while Thayer Hall is located next to Buhl Hall and the Eberly Library. Willison is the third men's hall and student apartment complex, it is mostly a double occupancy hall but students have the option to triple. Willison is six stories tall and is the newest building on campus. It is on Franklin street and is adjacent to the armory.

Denny Hall is attached to Benedum dining hall on the West side of campus, like Thayer it has built in desks and cabinets in the wall. It is one of three underclassmen women's halls. Across the parking lot overlooking the chapel is Burns hall and on the other side of the chapel is the single story Ray Hall.

The four upperclass women halls are West, South, East, and Pollock. West, South, and East sit above the Stover campus center and the Eberly Library in a small plaza. Pollock is located right between Buhl Hall, one of the classroom buildings, and Thayer Hall.

Fitness center
The fitness center is two stories. The first floor houses weight lifting and locker rooms. The second floor features cardio workouts. Both floors have flat screen TVs and the cardio machines are equipped with built in radio tuners.

Student life

Yellow Jacket student newspaper
The Yellow Jacket is the student newspaper for Waynesburg University. The newspaper is produced entirely by Waynesburg University students and is incorporated into many classes within the university's Department of Communication.

The Yellow Jacket features news on campus and community news, student opinion, coverage of the Presidents' Athletic Conference sports teams, and other topics of student or faculty interest. The Yellow Jacket publishes weekly during the academic year in print and online. The newspaper has been published under the Yellow Jacket nameplate since 1924, though student newspapers at Waynesburg University (then Waynesburg College) date back to 1894. Federal Judge John Clark Knox served as the first student editor of the first student newspaper at Waynesburg College. The Yellow Jacket is a member of the Pennsylvania NewsMedia Association and is affiliated with the Waynesburg University student chapter of the Society of Professional Journalists.

The staff of the Yellow Jacket has been recognized numerous times by the Pennsylvania NewsMedia Association's Keystone Awards and the Society of Professional Journalists regional Mark of Excellence Awards.

WCYJ-FM
WCYJ is a radio station located on the third floor of Buhl Hall. It is run by students and the Waynesburg communications staff. The station plays Adult Contemporary Top-40 hits from the studio at the entry to Buhl, and broadcasts out from the tower located on top of Buhl. The station broadcasts specialty shows, Waynesburg University sports, and even local high school football games.

The station's frequency, 99.5 FM, can be heard within the limits of the Waynesburg borough.

Every October the station hosts their largest event, Pumpkin Bowling, in Johnson Commons. Their relay for life event, the 24-hour broadcast, has been steadily growing. Radio staff stays in the radio station for 24 straight hours.

WCTV
Waynesburg Community Television is operated by students at Waynesburg University. The station is available via the Waynesburg Comcast cable system on channel 14 and online at wctv.waynesburg.edu. The studio is located on the 4th floor of Buhl Hall. WCTV broadcasts a variety of student and community oriented programming such as Jacket Sports Weekly, The Buzz, Live at 5 Newscast, Plead Your Case, The Journey and The Waynesburg Effect.

Community service
Through the Center for Service Leadership, students are connected with organizations according to their field of study. The college community commits over 50,000 hours of service each year to over 50 agencies and community projects. On average, university students perform 1,400 hours of community service a week, both domestically and internationally.

Waynesburg University is one of only 27 Bonner Scholar schools in the country offering local, regional and international opportunities to help others through community service. With support from the Corella and Bertram F. Bonner Foundation, this scholarship program offers selected students financial assistance in return for a commitment to community service while enrolled at Waynesburg.

As a Bonner Scholar school, Waynesburg University:

 Awards 15 new Waynesburg University Bonner Scholarships each academic year.
 Fosters a program with 60 students, who each serve an average of 10 hours per week.

To be considered for the Bonner Scholar program, an applicant must be accepted to Waynesburg University, must successfully complete the Bonner Scholarship application and interview process, and should:

 Carry a 3.0 cumulative high school GPA and place in the top 40% of a graduating high school class
 Qualify financially

Faith
The university emphasizes Christian and community values. Students have the option to participate in:

 Weekly chapel services
 Bible studies
 Contemporary, student-led weekly worship services
 Speakers who engage students to integrate faith, learning and service
 Fellowship of Christian Athletes (FCA)
 Faith and Services Mission Trips

The exploration of faith is encouraged on Waynesburg's campus, but at the discretion of the student.

Waynesburg welcomes students on any part of their journey into its Christian community.

Students may also choose to be involved in various campus ministries: for example, becoming a Christian Ministry Assistant (CMA). CMAs are student leaders who serve the community by creating Bible studies and building student relationships and groups across campus that enhance the mission of Waynesburg University.

Study abroad
The university offers its students various opportunities to study abroad. For example, students at Waynesburg University may study abroad through the Fulbright program.

Athletics
Waynesburg University teams, known athletically as the Yellow Jackets, compete in the Presidents' Athletic Conference (PAC) of the National Collegiate Athletic Association's (NCAA) Division III. Men's sports include baseball, basketball, cross country, football, golf, soccer, tennis, indoor and outdoor track & field and wrestling; while women's sports include basketball, cross country, golf, lacrosse, soccer, softball, tennis, indoor and outdoor track & field and volleyball.

In 1939, Waynesburg University's football team played in the first televised football game against Fordham University, losing by a score of 34 to 7. In 1966 under head coach Carl DePasqua, the Yellow Jackets football team won the NAIA Football National Championship game in Tulsa, Oklahoma. The Yellow Jackets are also 2–0 against Penn State. They played the Nittany Lions in 1931 and 1932, beating them 7–0 and 7–6, respectively.

In 1998, the Jacket baseball team defeated Grove City College to capture the PAC championship 5-4. From the 1998 team came a plethora of First team All-PAC selections including Brian Cutlip, Charlie Humes, Jim Ohara and Adam Jack, who was also named Player of the Year. The conference head coach of the year was also from Waynesburg, as the award went to Mike Florak who was assisted by Mike Humiston.

Notable alumni

Gallery

References

External links
Waynesburg University
Waynesburg University Athletics

 
Educational institutions established in 1849
Universities and colleges affiliated with the Presbyterian Church (USA)
Universities and colleges in Greene County, Pennsylvania
1849 establishments in Pennsylvania
Private universities and colleges in Pennsylvania